Battle Beast is a side-scrolling fighting game released for the PC in 1995.

Gameplay
In the style of Mortal Kombat or Street Fighter, a player can play against another human opponent or computer-controlled opponents in different levels using hand-to-hand combat, special moves and weapons to defeat each other.

Development
Battle Beast was developed by the American studio 7th Level.

Reception

Reviewing the Windows version, a Next Generation critic called Battle Beast "an incredibly fun and visually stunning fighting game". He complimented the play control, numerous secrets, and most especially the cute, humorous animation, concluding that "At its heart it's still just another 2D fighter, but its light-hearted feel gives it an edge over many of the others out there." He awarded it 3 out of 5 stars. The game received a positive review from Computer Game Review, which concluded, "Finally, a quality fight game worth owning."

Entertainment Weekly gave the game a B.

PC Gamer rated the game a 69 of 100 stating that" It's a decent fighting game, but one with significant flaws.

References

External links

1995 video games
DOS games
Classic Mac OS games
Multiplayer and single-player video games
Fighting games
Video games developed in the United States
Windows games
BMG Interactive games
7th Level games